Elzéar Gérin, (14 November 1843 – 18 August 1887), was a politician in Quebec, Canada.

He served as a member of the Legislative Assembly.

Federal Politics

He ran as a Conservative candidate in an 1868 by-election in the district of Saint-Maurice, but lost against another Conservative Élie Lacerte.

Provincial Politics

In 1871, Desaulniers became the Conservative Member of the Legislative Assembly for the district of Saint-Maurice.  He did not run for re-election in 1875.

He was appointed to the Legislative Council of Quebec in 1882 and died in office.

References

External links 
 

Elzear Gerin
1843 births
1887 deaths
Conservative Party of Quebec MNAs
Conservative Party of Quebec MLCs